Grgica Kovač (born 5 June 1966, in Split) is a retired Croatian football player who played for Hajduk Split and other Croatian and foreign clubs.

Managerial career
Kovač took charge of Solin after Ante Terze got the sack in November 2015 and was then named manager of BŠK Zmaj in October 2016. He left the club in May 2018. In February 2022, he succeeded Stipe Grčić as manager of Hrvace.

References

External links
 
 footballenfrance.fr at RSSSF.
 Archive of Hajduk Split matches at Hajduk Split official website.
 users.skynet.be 
 hrrepka.com:8080
 footmercato.net

1966 births
Living people
Footballers from Split, Croatia
Association football defenders
Yugoslav footballers
Croatian footballers
HNK Hajduk Split players
NK Varaždin players
K.S.C. Lokeren Oost-Vlaanderen players
Nîmes Olympique players
Hapoel Haifa F.C. players
NK Slaven Belupo players
Wisła Płock players
Yugoslav First League players
Croatian Football League players
Belgian Pro League players
Ligue 2 players
Israeli Premier League players
Ekstraklasa players
Croatian expatriate footballers
Expatriate footballers in Belgium
Expatriate footballers in France
Expatriate footballers in Israel
Expatriate footballers in Poland
Croatian expatriate sportspeople in Belgium
Croatian expatriate sportspeople in France
Croatian expatriate sportspeople in Israel
Croatian expatriate sportspeople in Poland
Croatian football managers
NK Solin managers